Maccabi Rugby Football Club is an amateur rugby union club that plays in the New South Wales Suburban Rugby Union.

History 
Founded in 1969, the club participated in sub-district Premierships winning in 1973 and 1977. After an almost twenty-year hiatus, the club was reformed in 2006 to provide the Australian Jewish community with its own club and strengthen their squads for the Maccabiah Games in Israel.

With the majority of the club having come back from winning the gold medal at the 2009 Maccabiah Games, the club was able to secure the 2009 Meldrum Cup.

Honours 
 Meldrum Cup (1st Grade): 2009

See also 
 History of the Jews in Australia
 Rugby union in Australia

Footnotes

External links 
 Maccabi.com.au

Rugby union teams in Sydney
Maccabi World Union
Rugby clubs established in 1969
1969 establishments in Australia
Diaspora sports clubs in Australia